Miguel Ángel García or variation, may refer to:

Single surname
 Miguel Ángel García (wrestler) (born 1960), Spanish wrestler
 Miguel Ángel García (boxer) (born 1987), Mexican American boxer

Matronymic surnamed
 Miguel Ángel Ruiz García (born 1955), Spanish footballer

Patronymic surnamed
 Miguel Ángel García Domínguez (1931–2015), Mexican politician
 Miguel Ángel García Granados (born 1952), Mexican politician
 Miguel Angel García Méndez (1902–1998), Puerto Rican politician
 Miguel Angel Garcia Perez-Roldan (born 1981), Spanish soccer player
 Miguel Ángel García Tébar (born 1979), Spanish soccer player

See also

 Miguel García (disambiguation)
 Angel Garcia (disambiguation)
 
 
 
 Miguel Angel García Méndez Post Office Building, Mayaguez, Puerto Rico
 Miguel (disambiguation)
 Angel (disambiguation)
 Garcia (disambiguation)